The 2002 Asian Super Cup was the 8th Asian Super Cup, a football match played between the winners of the previous season's Asian Club Championship and Asian Cup Winners Cup competitions. The 2002 competition was contested by Suwon Samsung Bluewings of South Korea, who won the Asian Club Championship 2001-02, and Al Hilal of Saudi Arabia, the winners of the Asian Cup Winners Cup 2002.

Route to the Super Cup

Suwon Samsung Bluewings 

1Suwon Samsung Bluewings goals always recorded first.
2 Saunders did not show up for the 2nd leg.

Al Hilal 

1Al Hilal goals always recorded first.

Game summary 

|}

First leg

Second leg

References 
 Asian Super Cup 2002

Asian Super Cup
Super Cup
2002
2002
Suwon Samsung Bluewings matches
Al Hilal SFC matches